Lake Darling State Park is a state park of Iowa, US.

It is located on Honey Creek, a minor tributary of the Skunk River.

History
Lake Darling State Park was dedicated on September 17, 1950.  The park is named after Jay Norwood "Ding" Darling.

Land usage
Lake Darling State Park has a picnic shelter, camping cabins, campsites, restrooms, playground equipment, boat rentals, several trails, and a beach. Lake Darling is also home to a variety of fish.

References

External links 
 Lake Darling State Park
Lake Darling State Park, IA

State parks of Iowa
Protected areas established in 1950
Protected areas of Washington County, Iowa
Darling
1950 establishments in Iowa
Bodies of water of Washington County, Iowa